Ukraine has competed at the European Games since the inaugural 2015 Games.

Medal tables

Medals by Games

Medals by sport

Gold medalists

See also
 Ukraine at the Olympics
 Ukraine at the Youth Olympics

References